William Potter (1799 – 16 September 1853) was an English cricketer with amateur status. He was associated with Surrey and made his first-class debut in 1829. He twice played for the Gentlemen against the Players, in 1829 and 1830.

References

1799 births
1853 deaths
English cricketers
English cricketers of 1826 to 1863
Gentlemen cricketers
Surrey cricketers